Theodor Pilartz (21 February 1887 – 29 June 1955) was a German sculptor. His work was part of the sculpture event in the art competition at the 1932 Summer Olympics.

References

1887 births
1955 deaths
20th-century German sculptors
20th-century German male artists
German male sculptors
Olympic competitors in art competitions
Artists from Cologne